Massospora is a genus of fungi in the Entomophthoraceae family, within the order Entomophthorales of the Zygomycota. This has been supported by molecular phylogenetic analysis (Gryganskyi et al. 2012).

It includes more than a dozen obligate, sexually transmissible pathogenic species that infect (and kill) adult gregarious cicadas (Hemiptera) worldwide. At least two species are known to produce psychoactive compounds during infection.

Named in 1879 by the American botanist Charles Horton Peck (1833-1917).

The genus name of Massospora was derived from two words in the Greek, masso which means 'to grind' and spora for 'spore'.
This then describes the complete disintegration of the host-insect’s internal tissues eventually leading to a (described by the author as); “pulverulent mass of spores within”  that can be seen after the terminal parts of the abdomen fall off.

Species
As accepted by Species Fungorum;

 Massospora carinetae 
 Massospora cicadettae 
 Massospora cicadina 
 Massospora diceroproctae 
 Massospora diminuta 
 Massospora dorisianae 
 Massospora fidicinae 
 Massospora levispora 
 Massospora ocypetes 
 Massospora pahariae 
 Massospora platypediae 
 Massospora spinosa 
 Massospora tettigatis 

Former species;
 M. agrotidis  = Sorosporella agrotidis, Hypocreales family
 M. cleoni  = Entomophthora cleoni, Entomophthoraceae
 M. richteri  = Entomophthora richteri, Entomophthoraceae
 M. staritzii  = Entomophthora staritzii, Entomophthoraceae
 M. tipulae  = Zoophthora porteri, Entomophthoraceae
 M. uvella  = Sorosporella uvella, Hypocreales

References

Animal fungal diseases
Insect diseases
Zygomycota